The men's 10,000 metres event at the 2019 Summer Universiade was held on 9 July at the Stadio San Paolo in Naples.

Results

References

10000
2019